Niédiékaha is a town in northern Ivory Coast. It is a sub-prefecture of Niakaramandougou Department in Hambol Region, Vallée du Bandama District.

Niédiékaha was a commune until March 2012, when it became one of 1126 communes nationwide that were abolished.

In 2014, the population of the sub-prefecture of Niédiékaha was 9,648.

Villages
The 7 villages of the sub-prefecture of Niédiékaha and their population in 2014 are:
 Doussoulokaha (825)
 Kolokaha (1 825)
 Koulokaha (1 217)
 Nambanakaha (844)
 Niédékaha (2 113)
 Niérétenkaha (188)
 Sépikaha (2 636)

Notes

Sub-prefectures of Hambol
Former communes of Ivory Coast